Blizzard Beasts is the fourth studio album by Norwegian black metal band Immortal. It was released on March 20, 1997 through Osmose Productions. It is the last Immortal album to feature the performance of founding member Demonaz Doom Occulta until Northern Chaos Gods  (2018) and the first to feature Horgh on drums. Demonaz was later diagnosed with acute tendinitis which prevented him from playing guitar at the required speed for Immortal's music. Stylistically, Blizzard Beasts has primarily songs that are less than three minutes long, contrasting with Immortal's usual longer song lengths.

Release 
On the first pressings of the album, the logo was etched into the jewel case front.

Critical reception 

AllMusic gave the album an unfavorable review, writing, "Blizzard Beasts [...] sounds like a rush job when compared to the rest of the band's triumphant catalog. The majesty of the group's songwriting is buried in the album's subpar production values, which render the potentially brilliant hyperspeed riffing and drum battery gutless and ineffectual." Chronicles of Chaos noted the album's death metal influence, comparing their sound to that of Morbid Angel's. The website ultimately called it an "unexpected and interesting change for the band, with some fierce and engaging material." Canadian journalist Martin Popoff remarked how the album covered "every facet of stand-alone black metal mayhem" and praised Immortal for playing "the very best no frills black metal on the planet."

Track listing

Personnel 
 Abbath Doom Occulta – vocals, bass guitar; keyboards
 Demonaz Doom Occulta – guitar
 Horgh – drums

Charts

References 

Immortal (band) albums
1997 albums
Osmose Productions albums